Irwin R. Franklyn was a writer and producer. Several of his works were filmed. He wrote novelizations of films including Flight: An Epic of the Air for Frank Capra's film.

Filmography

Novelizations
Flight, novelization of Frank Capra film
Song of Love (1929), novelization of photoplay

Producer, writer, or director
Harlem Is Heaven (1932), writer and director
Policy Man (1938), co-producer with Hazel Franklyn
Gone Harlem (1938)
Minstrel Man (1944), co-wrote screenplay adaptation
Waterfront (1944) co-wrote screenplay adaptation
The Lady Confesses (1945), writer
The Woman from Tangier (1948), writer
Daughter of the West (1949), screenplay

References

Year of birth missing
Year of death missing
Place of birth missing
American writers